Oak Ridge High School is a public high school 20 miles east of Sacramento, California, United States, in El Dorado Hills. It is part of the El Dorado Union High School District. Oak Ridge High School was established in 1980 with 222 students. As of the 2019-20 school year, Oak Ridge High School had 2,470 students. The school's principal is  Aaron Palm.

Academics
Oak Ridge offers a wide range of classes in history, English, foreign languages, mathematics, science, physical education, and electives, as well as a large drama and art department.  The school offers foreign languages such as Japanese, Italian, French, and Spanish. Oak Ridge is in the 96th percentile among Californian schools in SAT scores and has a 99.1% graduation rate as of 2008. The school was measured at 865 in the 2008 Academic Performance Index, compared with the California State average of 742 in 2008.

The school currently offers the following AP Classes: Biology, Calculus AB, Calculus BC, Chemistry, Computer Science A, Computer Science Principles, English Language, English Literature, Environmental Science, French Language, Microeconomics, Physics 1, Psychology, Spanish Language, Statistics, U.S. History, U.S. Government, and World History.

Alma mater
When sung or played, it goes to the tune of Cornell University's alma mater, "Far Above Cayuga's Waters". The song is intoned at the end of all ORHS football games, with the second verse and chorus omitted. The Oak Ridge Marching Band also plays then sings the alma mater following each home football game.

Athletics
Oak Ridge is a member of the Division I Sierra Foothill League. Previously it spent 15 years as a member of the Sierra Valley Conference of the Sac-Joaquin Section of the CIF. The school offers an extensive list of sport programs to its students, including baseball, cross country, football, basketball, golf, lacrosse, soccer, ski and snowboard, softball, swimming, tennis, track and field, volleyball, water polo, and wrestling.  Several sports are available through school-affiliated clubs, such as the Mother Lode Rugby Club, which combines men's and women's rugby for all of El Dorado County's high school students. Oak Ridge has had many student-athlete alumni go on to compete nationally at collegiate or professional levels.

Championships

The Oak Ridge football team won the D-II California State Championship in both 2003 and 2004, led by Austin Collie and Seyi Ajirotutu. After playing five season in the NFL and one season in the Canadian Football League, Collie retired from football in 2016. Ajirotutu played six seasons in the NFL.

Oak Ridge Basketball won the 2010 D-I California Women's State Championship. The boys won the D-II California State Championship in 2005.

Oak Ridge Trojans swim team won the CIF State swimming championship in May 2016 and May 2017. The Trojans also placed 2nd in May 2018. Most recently in May 2019 the Oak Ridge boys' swim team again placed second out of 236 California High School finalists in the CIF swim championships.

Oak Ridge's Girls Track and Field team placed 2nd in the 2018 CIF State Championships.

Oak Ridge Girls Varsity Soccer team won the Sac-Joaquin Section Championship in February, 2020.

Oak Ridge Girls Varsity Soccer team won the Norcal State Championship in March 2022

Notable alumni

 Lonni Alameda, Class of 1988, professional softball player and head softball coach at Florida State University
 Seyi Ajirotutu, Class of 2005, retired NFL wide receiver for the San Diego Chargers and Carolina Panthers
 Ryan Anderson, Class of 2006, after attending the University of California Berkeley, was drafted in the 2008 NBA draft, 21st overall to the New Jersey Nets
 Ian Book, Class of 2016, quarterback for the Philadelphia Eagles. Formerly quarterback for the Notre Dame Fighting Irish football team 2017-2020
 Sam Clemons, Class of 1997, football player
 Austin Collie, Class of 2004, NFL wide receiver; drafted by the Indianapolis Colts in the fourth round (127th overall) in the 2009 NFL Draft; retired in 2016
 Marvin Philip, Class of 2000, University of California, Berkeley Football All-American. Drafted in 2006 as a Center by the NFL’s Pittsburgh Steelers
 F. P. Santangelo, Class of 1985, former professional baseball player (1995–2001) who played for the Montreal Expos, San Francisco Giants, Los Angeles Dodgers, and Oakland Athletics
 Ross Dwelley, Class of 2013, currently plays for the San Francisco 49ers
 Shane Steichen, Class of 2003, NFL head coach of the Indianapolis Colts
 Bryce Mefford, Class of 2017, University of California swimmer, placed second in the 200m Backstroke final of the US Olympic Team Trials in Omaha, qualifying him for the 2020 Olympic Games.

Controversies
On February 25, 2016, during a girls varsity basketball game where Oak Ridge was playing C. K. McClatchy High School at home, the Oak Ridge student section was accused of chanting racial slurs toward C.K McClatchy's Asian players. Oak Ridge's principal later issued a statement detailing the disciplinary actions the school would take.

On March 5, 2022, during a girls varsity soccer game where Oak Ridge was playing Buchanan High School (Clovis, California) at home, an Oak Ridge fan made racial taunts which were audible monkey and barking sounds that could be heard across the stadium. This occurred during a shootout after the game went into overtime. Barking sounds were first made after a Buchanan player of Hispanic race took their shot. Later, an African American Buchanan player took a  shot and monkey noises followed right after. Oak Ridge's principal, Aaron Palm, later issued an apology to Buchanan administrators, including the Buchanan athletic director, and stated that a full investigation was made to determine the student who made the noises.

References

External links
 

High schools in El Dorado County, California
Public high schools in California
1980 establishments in California
Educational institutions established in 1980